John Sapcote (died 1574), of Therfield, Hertfordshire and Lincolnshire, was an English politician.

He was a Member (MP) of the Parliament of England for Ripon in 1559.

References

Year of birth missing
1574 deaths
English MPs 1559
People from North Hertfordshire District